The Nord CT.41 Narwhal was a French target drone, designed and built by Nord Aviation during the late 1950s for the purpose of providing training in the interception of supersonic bomber aircraft.

Design and development
Starting development in 1957, the CT.41 used a canard configuration, with a short, straight wing located at mid-fuselage with wingtip-mounted ramjet engines. Launched using an elevating ramp, two solid rocket boosters provided initial thrust upon launch, with the ramjets igniting at a speed of Mach 1.7. Command guidance was used for control; the aircraft could be fitted with electronic enhancers and flares to boost its target signature. Two types were produced, the CT.41A for high-altitude use, and the CT.41B for low-altitude training. If the drone was not shot down, recovery was via parachute.

Operational history
The CT.41 began test flights during 1959, with production starting later that year; 62 aircraft were constructed for use by the French Air Force. They had only a brief service life before being retired due to being too fast to provide practical training for interceptor pilots. Hawker Siddeley acquired a manufacturing license for the type in November 1960. Six were acquired by Bell Aircraft for evaluation by the United States Navy; Bell also acquired a production license for the type, which in 1962 received the U.S. designation PQM-56A. The PQM-56A was out of service by the early 1970s.

Specifications

References

Citations

Bibliography

CT41
1950s French special-purpose aircraft
Target drones of France
Twinjets
Ramjet-powered aircraft
Mid-wing aircraft
Canard aircraft
Aircraft first flown in 1959